Brigitta Cserba (born 3 December 1968) is a Hungarian diver. She competed in the women's 10 metre platform event at the 1992 Summer Olympics.

References

External links
 

1968 births
Living people
Hungarian female divers
Olympic divers of Hungary
Divers at the 1992 Summer Olympics
Divers from Budapest
Sportspeople from Budapest